Bolze is a mixed language spoken in the Basse-Ville district of Fribourg, Switzerland. A mixture of French and Swiss German, Bolze came into being as a result of the immigration of German speakers from the Sense District of the Canton of Fribourg starting from the 19th century. By 2019 the language was reportedly spoken only by a handful of locals.

Origins 
The city of Fribourg is located on the border of two Swiss language regions. Landless farmers from Fribourg moved to the lower town (the old town) from the 19th century to the 1940s. Their immigrant children spoke German at home and a mixture of French and German in the street: Bolze.

See also
 Portuñol

References

Languages of Switzerland
Code-switching
Mixed languages
City colloquials
Fribourg
Languages attested from the 19th century